A reverse blog is a type of blog that is characterized by the lack of a single, specific blogger. In a traditional blog a blogger will write his or her comments about a given topic and other users may view and sometimes comment on the bloggers work. A reverse blog is written entirely by the users, who are given a topic.  The blog posts are usually screened and chosen for publication by a core group or the publisher of the blog.

Overview
A reverse blog is characterized primarily by the lack of a blogger on a site providing blog-style content. The number of comments must be limited in order to differentiate a reverse blog from a forum. This number of comments must be fixed as well. These are the primary and necessary characteristics of a reverse blog. The reverse blog is also commonly called an inverse blog.

Common features
These features are common or popular among reverse blogs, but not necessary.
 An approval system to rate comments
 A login form to track user actions
 Moderators and user hierarchy to enforce content

Purposes 
The Reverse Blog has gained popularity over the years as users have developed a disdain for traditional blogging. In general, users are not willing to monitor the comments of one blogger. Instead, they would prefer to make a blog themselves. In order to deal with the increasing number of unread blogs, reverse blogs were created. These focus users into a common area to represent various topics and (optionally) rate each other's content.

Notes 

Blogging